The Braille pattern dots-14 is a 6-dot or 8-dot braille cell with the two top dots raised. It is represented by the Unicode code point U+2809, and in Braille ASCII with "C".

Unified Braille

In unified international braille, the braille pattern dots-14 is used to represent unvoiced palatal fricatives or unvoiced alveolar affricates, such as /ts/, or /ç/, and is otherwise assigned as needed. It is also used to indicate the number 3.

Table of unified braille values

Other braille

Plus dots 7 and 8

Related to Braille pattern dots-14 are Braille patterns 147, 148, and 1478, which are used in 8-dot braille systems, such as Gardner-Salinas and Luxembourgish Braille.

Related 8-dot kantenji patterns

In the Japanese kantenji braille, the standard 8-dot Braille patterns 25, 125, 245, and 1245 are the patterns related to Braille pattern dots-14, since the two additional dots of kantenji patterns 014, 147, and 0147 are placed above the base 6-dot cell, instead of below, as in standard 8-dot braille.

Kantenji using braille patterns 25, 125, 245, or 1245

This listing includes kantenji using Braille pattern dots-14 for all 6349 kanji found in JIS C 6226-1978.

  - 家

Variants and thematic compounds

  -  selector 1 + う/宀/#3  =  参
  -  う/宀/#3 + selector 1 + selector 1  =  宀
  -  selector 2 + う/宀/#3  =  孚
  -  selector 3 + う/宀/#3  =  冢
  -  selector 4 + selector 4 + う/宀/#3  =  彡
  -  う/宀/#3 + selector 4  =  宙
  -  selector 5 + う/宀/#3  =  彭
  -  selector 6 + う/宀/#3  =  宛
  -  数 + #3  =  三
  -  比 + う/宀/#3  =  上

Compounds of 家

  -  ふ/女 + う/宀/#3  =  嫁
  -  の/禾 + 宿 + う/宀/#3  =  糘
  -  ひ/辶 + う/宀/#3 + り/分  =  邃

Compounds of 宀

  -  う/宀/#3 + こ/子  =  字
  -  う/宀/#3 + な/亻  =  宅
  -  龸 + う/宀/#3 + な/亻  =  亳
  -  な/亻 + う/宀/#3 + な/亻  =  侘
  -  れ/口 + う/宀/#3 + な/亻  =  咤
  -  う/宀/#3 + し/巿  =  守
  -  う/宀/#3 + ふ/女  =  安
  -  や/疒 + う/宀/#3 + ふ/女  =  妛
  -  日 + う/宀/#3 + ふ/女  =  晏
  -  へ/⺩ + う/宀/#3 + ふ/女  =  珱
  -  せ/食 + う/宀/#3 + ふ/女  =  鮟
  -  う/宀/#3 + 宿  =  完
  -  に/氵 + う/宀/#3 + 宿  =  浣
  -  日 + う/宀/#3 + 宿  =  皖
  -  心 + う/宀/#3 + 宿  =  莞
  -  う/宀/#3 + ね/示  =  宗
  -  心 + う/宀/#3 + ね/示  =  棕
  -  に/氵 + う/宀/#3 + ね/示  =  淙
  -  の/禾 + う/宀/#3 + ね/示  =  粽
  -  い/糹/#2 + う/宀/#3 + ね/示  =  綜
  -  み/耳 + う/宀/#3 + ね/示  =  踪
  -  う/宀/#3 + ら/月  =  官
  -  い/糹/#2 + う/宀/#3 + ら/月  =  綰
  -  う/宀/#3 + よ/广  =  定
  -  て/扌 + う/宀/#3 + よ/广  =  掟
  -  に/氵 + う/宀/#3 + よ/广  =  淀
  -  ま/石 + う/宀/#3 + よ/广  =  碇
  -  い/糹/#2 + う/宀/#3 + よ/广  =  綻
  -  み/耳 + う/宀/#3 + よ/广  =  聢
  -  え/訁 + う/宀/#3 + よ/广  =  諚
  -  う/宀/#3 + そ/馬  =  宜
  -  心 + う/宀/#3 + そ/馬  =  萓
  -  え/訁 + う/宀/#3 + そ/馬  =  誼
  -  う/宀/#3 + へ/⺩  =  宝
  -  selector 1 + う/宀/#3 + へ/⺩  =  寳
  -  う/宀/#3 + う/宀/#3 + へ/⺩  =  寶
  -  火 + う/宀/#3 + へ/⺩  =  瑩
  -  う/宀/#3 + は/辶  =  実
  -  う/宀/#3 + 日  =  宣
  -  れ/口 + う/宀/#3 + 日  =  喧
  -  る/忄 + う/宀/#3 + 日  =  愃
  -  日 + う/宀/#3 + 日  =  暄
  -  心 + う/宀/#3 + 日  =  萱
  -  え/訁 + う/宀/#3 + 日  =  諠
  -  う/宀/#3 + ゆ/彳  =  室
  -  心 + う/宀/#3 + ゆ/彳  =  榁
  -  ⺼ + う/宀/#3 + ゆ/彳  =  腟
  -  う/宀/#3 + み/耳  =  宮
  -  う/宀/#3 + ま/石  =  宰
  -  に/氵 + う/宀/#3 + ま/石  =  滓
  -  い/糹/#2 + う/宀/#3 + ま/石  =  縡
  -  う/宀/#3 + た/⽥  =  容
  -  き/木 + う/宀/#3 + た/⽥  =  榕
  -  火 + う/宀/#3 + た/⽥  =  熔
  -  の/禾 + う/宀/#3 + た/⽥  =  穃
  -  心 + う/宀/#3 + た/⽥  =  蓉
  -  か/金 + う/宀/#3 + た/⽥  =  鎔
  -  う/宀/#3 + う/宀/#3  =  寂
  -  う/宀/#3 + か/金  =  寄
  -  う/宀/#3 + え/訁  =  寅
  -  う/宀/#3 + や/疒  =  密
  -  心 + う/宀/#3 + や/疒  =  樒
  -  う/宀/#3 + 氷/氵  =  寒
  -  う/宀/#3 + く/艹  =  寓
  -  う/宀/#3 + さ/阝  =  察
  -  う/宀/#3 + ろ/十  =  寮
  -  う/宀/#3 + 宿 + ひ/辶  =  它
  -  う/宀/#3 + 数 + え/訁  =  宍
  -  う/宀/#3 + 宿 + ま/石  =  宕
  -  う/宀/#3 + ろ/十 + ら/月  =  宥
  -  う/宀/#3 + selector 4 + す/発  =  宦
  -  う/宀/#3 + selector 4 + ろ/十  =  宸
  -  う/宀/#3 + ぬ/力 + 宿  =  寃
  -  う/宀/#3 + selector 1 + 宿  =  寇
  -  う/宀/#3 + selector 4 + い/糹/#2  =  寉
  -  う/宀/#3 + き/木 + selector 4  =  寐
  -  う/宀/#3 + 日 + よ/广  =  寔
  -  う/宀/#3 + 宿 + く/艹  =  寞
  -  う/宀/#3 + ら/月 + れ/口  =  寤
  -  う/宀/#3 + 宿 + き/木  =  寨
  -  う/宀/#3 + 宿 + selector 1  =  寫
  -  う/宀/#3 + 宿 + る/忄  =  寰
  -  う/宀/#3 + を/貝  =  賓
  -  ふ/女 + う/宀/#3 + を/貝  =  嬪
  -  て/扌 + う/宀/#3 + を/貝  =  擯
  -  心 + う/宀/#3 + を/貝  =  檳
  -  ほ/方 + う/宀/#3 + を/貝  =  殯
  -  い/糹/#2 + う/宀/#3 + を/貝  =  繽
  -  う/宀/#3 + ぬ/力  =  寡
  -  う/宀/#3 + り/分  =  穴
  -  う/宀/#3 + 宿 + せ/食  =  鴪
  -  い/糹/#2 + う/宀/#3 + り/分  =  穽
  -  こ/子 + う/宀/#3 + り/分  =  窖
  -  か/金 + う/宀/#3 + り/分  =  窩
  -  火 + う/宀/#3 + り/分  =  竃
  -  氷/氵 + う/宀/#3 + り/分  =  竅
  -  つ/土 + う/宀/#3 + り/分  =  竇
  -  う/宀/#3 + お/頁  =  究
  -  う/宀/#3 + き/木  =  空
  -  な/亻 + う/宀/#3 + き/木  =  倥
  -  れ/口 + う/宀/#3 + き/木  =  啌
  -  き/木 + う/宀/#3 + き/木  =  椌
  -  ち/竹 + う/宀/#3 + き/木  =  箜
  -  ⺼ + う/宀/#3 + き/木  =  腔
  -  う/宀/#3 + け/犬  =  突
  -  う/宀/#3 + れ/口  =  窃
  -  う/宀/#3 + に/氵  =  窪
  -  う/宀/#3 + 火  =  窯
  -  う/宀/#3 + む/車  =  蜜
  -  心 + う/宀/#3 + む/車  =  櫁
  -  う/宀/#3 + う/宀/#3 + れ/口  =  竊
  -  う/宀/#3 + ゆ/彳 + selector 1  =  穹
  -  う/宀/#3 + 宿 + さ/阝  =  窄
  -  う/宀/#3 + ゐ/幺 + selector 1  =  窈
  -  う/宀/#3 + 数 + 宿  =  窕
  -  う/宀/#3 + お/頁 + selector 1  =  窘
  -  う/宀/#3 + と/戸 + へ/⺩  =  窟
  -  う/宀/#3 + 宿 + 火  =  窰
  -  う/宀/#3 + 宿 + 数  =  窶
  -  う/宀/#3 + さ/阝 + せ/食  =  窿
  -  う/宀/#3 + け/犬 + selector 5  =  竄
  -  て/扌 + 龸 + う/宀/#3  =  搴
  -  う/宀/#3 + 宿 + ゑ/訁  =  謇
  -  う/宀/#3 + み/耳 + selector 2  =  蹇
  -  う/宀/#3 + う/宀/#3 + は/辶  =  實
  -  う/宀/#3 + 宿 + そ/馬  =  騫
  -  う/宀/#3 + そ/馬 + selector 1  =  牢

Compounds of 参

  -  selector 1 + selector 1 + う/宀/#3  =  參
  -  に/氵 + selector 1 + う/宀/#3  =  滲
  -  く/艹 + selector 1 + う/宀/#3  =  蔘
  -  そ/馬 + selector 1 + う/宀/#3  =  驂
  -  せ/食 + う/宀/#3 + う/宀/#3  =  鰺
  -  せ/食 + う/宀/#3 + う/宀/#3  =  鰺
  -  な/亻 + う/宀/#3  =  修
  -  く/艹 + な/亻 + う/宀/#3  =  蓚
  -  る/忄 + う/宀/#3  =  惨
  -  る/忄 + る/忄 + う/宀/#3  =  慘
  -  せ/食 + selector 1 + う/宀/#3  =  鯵

Compounds of 孚

  -  氷/氵 + う/宀/#3  =  浮
  -  ふ/女 + 氷/氵 + う/宀/#3  =  艀
  -  む/車 + 氷/氵 + う/宀/#3  =  蜉
  -  さ/阝 + 氷/氵 + う/宀/#3  =  郛
  -  な/亻 + 宿 + う/宀/#3  =  俘
  -  う/宀/#3 + selector 2 + さ/阝  =  孵
  -  き/木 + selector 2 + う/宀/#3  =  桴
  -  ほ/方 + 龸 + う/宀/#3  =  殍

Compounds of 冢

  -  つ/土 + う/宀/#3  =  塚

Compounds of 宙

  -  う/宀/#3 + の/禾  =  審
  -  に/氵 + う/宀/#3 + の/禾  =  瀋

Compounds of 彭

  -  ら/月 + う/宀/#3  =  膨
  -  に/氵 + 宿 + う/宀/#3  =  澎
  -  ね/示 + う/宀/#3  =  形
  -  ね/示 + 宿 + う/宀/#3  =  衫
  -  よ/广 + う/宀/#3  =  彦
  -  え/訁 + う/宀/#3  =  諺
  -  お/頁 + う/宀/#3  =  顔
  -  お/頁 + お/頁 + う/宀/#3  =  顏
  -  な/亻 + よ/广 + う/宀/#3  =  偐
  -  ち/竹 + う/宀/#3  =  彩
  -  囗 + う/宀/#3  =  彫
  -  ち/竹 + 囗 + う/宀/#3  =  簓
  -  ま/石 + う/宀/#3  =  彰
  -  日 + う/宀/#3  =  影
  -  心 + う/宀/#3  =  杉
  -  き/木 + 心 + う/宀/#3  =  彬
  -  ゑ/訁 + う/宀/#3  =  診
  -  へ/⺩ + う/宀/#3  =  珍
  -  ほ/方 + 宿 + う/宀/#3  =  殄
  -  た/⽥ + 宿 + う/宀/#3  =  畛
  -  や/疒 + 宿 + う/宀/#3  =  疹
  -  ね/示 + う/宀/#3 + う/宀/#3  =  袗
  -  は/辶 + 宿 + う/宀/#3  =  趁
  -  む/車 + 龸 + う/宀/#3  =  軫
  -  せ/食 + 宿 + う/宀/#3  =  餮
  -  う/宀/#3 + 宿 + う/宀/#3  =  寥
  -  て/扌 + う/宀/#3 + う/宀/#3  =  摎
  -  て/扌 + う/宀/#3 + う/宀/#3  =  摎
  -  け/犬 + 宿 + う/宀/#3  =  尨
  -  よ/广 + 宿 + う/宀/#3  =  厖
  -  と/戸 + う/宀/#3  =  髪
  -  と/戸 + う/宀/#3 + ま/石  =  鬘
  -  と/戸 + と/戸 + う/宀/#3  =  髮
  -  せ/食 + と/戸 + う/宀/#3  =  髦
  -  も/門 + と/戸 + う/宀/#3  =  髱
  -  と/戸 + う/宀/#3 + る/忄  =  鬟
  -  う/宀/#3 + す/発 + selector 3  =  彪
  -  う/宀/#3 + す/発  =  須
  -  と/戸 + う/宀/#3 + す/発  =  鬚

Compounds of 宛

  -  selector 6 + selector 6 + う/宀/#3  =  彑
  -  く/艹 + 宿 + う/宀/#3  =  苑
  -  ⺼ + う/宀/#3  =  腕
  -  ふ/女 + 宿 + う/宀/#3  =  婉
  -  ま/石 + 宿 + う/宀/#3  =  碗
  -  む/車 + 宿 + う/宀/#3  =  蜿
  -  う/宀/#3 + selector 5 + と/戸  =  豌
  -  か/金 + 宿 + う/宀/#3  =  鋺
  -  き/木 + 宿 + う/宀/#3  =  椀

Compounds of 三

  -  れ/口 + う/宀/#3  =  品
  -  い/糹/#2 + う/宀/#3  =  繰
  -  す/発 + う/宀/#3  =  臨
  -  み/耳 + う/宀/#3  =  躁
  -  て/扌 + う/宀/#3  =  操
  -  火 + う/宀/#3  =  燥
  -  や/疒 + れ/口 + う/宀/#3  =  嵒
  -  る/忄 + れ/口 + う/宀/#3  =  懆
  -  に/氵 + れ/口 + う/宀/#3  =  澡
  -  え/訁 + れ/口 + う/宀/#3  =  譟
  -  れ/口 + 宿 + う/宀/#3  =  噪
  -  う/宀/#3 + 比 + え/訁  =  髞
  -  き/木 + う/宀/#3  =  森
  -  む/車 + う/宀/#3  =  轟
  -  そ/馬 + う/宀/#3 + そ/馬  =  驫

Compounds of 上

  -  や/疒 + う/宀/#3  =  峠
  -  つ/土 + 比 + う/宀/#3  =  垰
  -  ね/示 + う/宀/#3 + 龸  =  裃
  -  と/戸 + う/宀/#3 + 龸  =  鞐
  -  に/氵 + う/宀/#3  =  淑
  -  う/宀/#3 + め/目  =  督

Other compounds

  -  せ/食 + う/宀/#3  =  烏
  -  れ/口 + せ/食 + う/宀/#3  =  嗚
  -  つ/土 + せ/食 + う/宀/#3  =  塢
  -  そ/馬 + う/宀/#3  =  兎
  -  そ/馬 + そ/馬 + う/宀/#3  =  兔
  -  心 + そ/馬 + う/宀/#3  =  莵
  -  さ/阝 + う/宀/#3  =  卯
  -  日 + さ/阝 + う/宀/#3  =  昴
  -  心 + さ/阝 + う/宀/#3  =  茆
  -  く/艹 + う/宀/#3  =  急
  -  ひ/辶 + う/宀/#3  =  戚
  -  心 + ひ/辶 + う/宀/#3  =  槭
  -  け/犬 + う/宀/#3  =  狙
  -  め/目 + う/宀/#3  =  眺
  -  の/禾 + う/宀/#3  =  糎
  -  こ/子 + う/宀/#3  =  虹
  -  を/貝 + う/宀/#3  =  賽
  -  う/宀/#3 + 囗  =  亮
  -  れ/口 + う/宀/#3 + 囗  =  喨
  -  う/宀/#3 + ゑ/訁  =  叔
  -  心 + う/宀/#3 + ゑ/訁  =  椒
  -  な/亻 + う/宀/#3 + ゑ/訁  =  俶
  -  う/宀/#3 + つ/土  =  塞
  -  う/宀/#3 + い/糹/#2  =  彙
  -  う/宀/#3 + 心  =  憲
  -  う/宀/#3 + て/扌  =  挙
  -  う/宀/#3 + う/宀/#3 + て/扌  =  擧
  -  ね/示 + う/宀/#3 + て/扌  =  襷
  -  selector 1 + う/宀/#3 + て/扌  =  舉
  -  数 + う/宀/#3 + 龸  =  卍
  -  か/金 + う/宀/#3 + ろ/十  =  瓧
  -  か/金 + う/宀/#3 + 日  =  瓰
  -  う/宀/#3 + selector 6 + か/金  =  甍
  -  と/戸 + う/宀/#3 + ぬ/力  =  剏
  -  れ/口 + う/宀/#3 + め/目  =  嚔
  -  ふ/女 + う/宀/#3 + ぬ/力  =  娚
  -  や/疒 + う/宀/#3 + り/分  =  岔
  -  や/疒 + う/宀/#3 + 日  =  岶
  -  や/疒 + う/宀/#3 + む/車  =  峻
  -  や/疒 + う/宀/#3 + か/金  =  崋
  -  や/疒 + う/宀/#3 + 比  =  崑
  -  や/疒 + う/宀/#3 + い/糹/#2  =  崔
  -  や/疒 + う/宀/#3 + つ/土  =  崖
  -  や/疒 + う/宀/#3 + る/忄  =  崙
  -  や/疒 + う/宀/#3 + す/発  =  崚
  -  や/疒 + う/宀/#3 + く/艹  =  嵎
  -  や/疒 + う/宀/#3 + け/犬  =  嵜
  -  や/疒 + う/宀/#3 + そ/馬  =  嵳
  -  や/疒 + う/宀/#3 + ま/石  =  嶂
  -  や/疒 + う/宀/#3 + せ/食  =  嶌
  -  や/疒 + う/宀/#3 + お/頁  =  巍
  -  や/疒 + う/宀/#3 + え/訁  =  巒
  -  て/扌 + う/宀/#3 + ぬ/力  =  抛
  -  て/扌 + う/宀/#3 + な/亻  =  抬
  -  き/木 + う/宀/#3 + ぬ/力  =  朸
  -  心 + う/宀/#3 + ま/石  =  柘
  -  き/木 + う/宀/#3 + か/金  =  桿
  -  き/木 + う/宀/#3 + 日  =  檐
  -  に/氵 + う/宀/#3 + む/車  =  淕
  -  に/氵 + う/宀/#3 + ぬ/力  =  渊
  -  に/氵 + う/宀/#3 + ん/止  =  澀
  -  の/禾 + う/宀/#3 + 比  =  粃
  -  心 + う/宀/#3 + き/木  =  菻
  -  心 + う/宀/#3 + も/門  =  蒟
  -  心 + う/宀/#3 + て/扌  =  蓴
  -  心 + う/宀/#3 + の/禾  =  藜
  -  心 + う/宀/#3 + い/糹/#2  =  藺
  -  に/氵 + う/宀/#3 + そ/馬  =  覊
  -  け/犬 + う/宀/#3 + り/分  =  豬
  -  む/車 + う/宀/#3 + ち/竹  =  輌
  -  む/車 + う/宀/#3 + の/禾  =  轎
  -  ひ/辶 + う/宀/#3 + む/車  =  逡
  -  か/金 + う/宀/#3 + け/犬  =  鐡
  -  も/門 + う/宀/#3 + へ/⺩  =  閠
  -  心 + う/宀/#3 + 火  =  韮
  -  氷/氵 + う/宀/#3 + そ/馬  =  馮
  -  も/門 + う/宀/#3 + し/巿  =  鬧
  -  せ/食 + う/宀/#3 + ま/石  =  鮖
  -  せ/食 + う/宀/#3 + の/禾  =  鰕
  -  せ/食 + う/宀/#3 + ら/月  =  鰡
  -  せ/食 + う/宀/#3 + ⺼  =  鰮
  -  龸 + う/宀/#3 + せ/食  =  鳧
  -  ゆ/彳 + う/宀/#3 + せ/食  =  鵆
  -  囗 + う/宀/#3 + せ/食  =  鵤
  -  ひ/辶 + う/宀/#3 + せ/食  =  鶇
  -  よ/广 + う/宀/#3 + せ/食  =  鶩
  -  ろ/十 + う/宀/#3 + せ/食  =  鷯
  -  な/亻 + れ/口 + う/宀/#3  =  侃
  -  ち/竹 + う/宀/#3 + い/糹/#2  =  籬
  -  う/宀/#3 + selector 4 + ゑ/訁  =  攴
  -  心 + き/木 + う/宀/#3  =  杜
  -  め/目 + 宿 + う/宀/#3  =  眄
  -  selector 4 + む/車 + う/宀/#3  =  軣
  -  う/宀/#3 + め/目 + う/宀/#3  =  鼎

Notes

Braille patterns